A zonal plant is a “species or variety which is of value in determining floral zones.” Botanist Frederick Vernon Coville defined the expression. He described "the best method of procedure in a new area to establish the (floral) zones by means of a comparatively small number of the best zonal plants, and afterwards to arrange the other less important [plants] in their proper places."

References

Botany